The 2023 Japanese Super Formula Championship will be the fifty-first season of premier Japanese open-wheel motor racing, and the eleventh under the moniker of Super Formula. It is scheduled to start in April 2023 and is due to be contested over seven race meetings. Tomoki Nojiri enters the season as the two-time and defending series champion.

2023 will be the first season for the new Dallara SF23 chassis. The SF23 is constructed from Bcomp bio-composite material aimed at reducing carbon dioxide emissions by approximately 75 percent, and features updated aerodynamic features aimed at reducing turbulent air and promoting more wheel-to-wheel racing. Series tyre supplier Yokohama Rubber will debut a new "carbon neutral racing tyre" made from 33 percent recycled and renewable raw materials.

Teams and drivers 
All teams use identical Dallara-built SF23 chassis.

Team changes

 Red Bull left Team Goh and moved its sponsorship efforts to Lawson's Team Mugen entry. The loss of this sponsorship left Team Goh in doubts whether they would be able to continue their participation in the championship for 2023. Servus Japan, the organization behind the team, later announced that the team would relaunch as TGM Grand Prix and confirmed that they would run two cars in 2023.
 After two seasons running one car, B-Max Racing will expand to two cars for this season.
 ThreeBond, who have been main sponsors for the Drago Corse team, have acquired the team's entry and rebranded as ThreeBond Racing.

Driver changes 

 2022 Super Formula Lights champion Kazuto Kotaka was promoted to Super Formula as one of Kondō Racing's two drivers. Kotaka, who drove most of the 2021 season for KCMG, replaces Sacha Fenestraz, who left the series to drive for Nissan in Formula E.
 Raoul Hyman was awarded a Honda Super Formula scholarship for winning the 2022 Formula Regional Americas Championship title, and will drive for B-Max Racing.
 FIA Formula 2 driver and Red Bull junior Liam Lawson will make his Super Formula debut, replacing Ukyo Sasahara at Team Mugen. Sasahara later agreed to become the development driver for Super Formula's Toyota-powered research and development vehicle.
 2022 Super Formula Lights runner-up Kakunoshin Ohta was promoted to Super Formula and will make his debut with Dandelion Racing, replacing Hiroki Otsu, who did not return to the series.
 2022 Rookie of the Year winner Ren Sato will move to Nakajima Racing to replace Toshiki Oyu. His Team Goh teammate Atsushi Miyake leaves the series.
 The newly rebranded team TGM Grand Prix signed Toshiki Oyu, and rookie Cem Bölükbaşı, who competed in Formula 2 in 2022. Bölükbaşı will be the first Turkish driver to race in the series.

Race calendar 
The provisional calendar was announced on 8 August 2022. After three weekends were made to double-header events in 2022, the season opener and finale were both announced to have two races again.

References

External links 

 Japanese Championship Super Formula official website 

2023
Super Formula
Super Formula
Super Formula